The village of San Carlos is located in the north of Belize, in Orange Walk District, on the northern bank of New River, surrounded by jungle. It is four miles from Indian Church, and can be accessed by road from Orange Walk Town or by boat from the New River.

San Carlos is small, with a population of 154 (2013) of Mestizo ethnicity. The village was set up by a group of families around 1970 from the larger town of Guinea Grass Town. Other inhabitants are originally from Guatemala, immigrating to Belize during the tumultuous years of civil war. The village is still technologically primitive. Water is pumped from wells for washing and bathing. Rain water tanks collect plenty of drinking water during the months of June thru December. An NGO donated 25 solar panels to the community providing evening light to 25 homes. A few families have purchased their own solar panels while a few families rely solely on kerosene lamps or candles. There are 32 occupied homes and 36 families in the Village. Additionally, a few villagers own generators to pump water from the wells, power washing machines, light, television, and irrigation systems.

Its economy revolves around agriculture, although a number of men are currently employed at the Maya ruins at Lamanai in order to restore some of the temples. A number of men with pickup trucks are hired by the Mennonites in nearby communities (Indian Creek and Shipyard) to drive, help with farming, and running errands. Agricultural pursuits include a host of fruits and vegetables, including onions, habanero peppers, bananas and watermelons.

A future prospect for San Carlos is to acquire capital for a jetty out into the picturesque lagoon in order to profit from Belize's booming tourism industry as it would allow visitors to the ruins at Lamanai to visit this friendly community. There is currently one U.S. Peace Corps volunteer living in the village working on the rural family health project implemented by the Peace Corps and the Ministry of Health in Belize.

Populated places in Orange Walk District
Mestizo communities in Belize